Alice Dye (February 19, 1927 – February 1, 2019) was an American amateur golfer and golf course designer known as the "First Lady" of golf architecture in the United States.

Biography 
Born Alice Holliday O'Neal in Indianapolis, Indiana, she began playing golf at a young age as a result of her father's influence, winning eleven Indianapolis Women's City titles. She graduated from Shortridge High School, and in 1946 won the first of her nine Indiana Women's Golf Association Amateur Championships. While a student at Rollins College in Winter Park, Florida, she was captain of the golf team. At college she met Paul "Pete" Dye, Jr. following his discharge from World War II military service. She graduated in 1948 with a B.S. degree.

In early 1950 after Alice's graduation, she and Pete Dye were married. The couple partnered to form Dye Designs, a firm specializing in golf-course designs. The firm became so successful in creating over 100 golf courses over the world. Their marriage produced two sons, Perry and P.B. (Paul Burke), as well as one of the top design teams of American golf courses, famous for their design of the TPC at Sawgrass (it was Alice who came up with the idea of the Island Green, the signature 17th hole at Sawgrass' Stadium Course) and for being the first firm in America to introduce design elements for golf courses used in Scotland. She became the first woman president of the American Society of Golf Course Architects, and the first to serve as an independent director of Professional Golfers' Association of America (PGA). Another of Alice's significant contributions was shortening the yardage for women in the golf designs, making them more accessible to the players.

She won the 1968 North and South Women's Amateur and was a member of the 1970 United States Curtis Cup team. Dye won the 1978 and 1979 U.S. Senior Women's Amateur as well as two Canadian Women's Senior Championships.

She was a member of the USGA Women's Committee, the LPGA Advisory Council and a member of the Board of Directors of the Women's Western Amateur who honored her with their Woman of Distinction Award. She and her husband established a golf training program at Purdue University.

Alice Dye was inducted into the Indiana Golf  Hall of Fame in 1976 and in 2004 was voted the PGA's First Lady of Golf Award.  She collaborated on the book "From Birdies to Bunkers: Discover How Golf Can Bring Love, Humor and Success into Your Life" with Mark Shaw that was published in 2004 with a foreword by Nancy Lopez.

Alice Dye died at the age of 91 years old in Gulf Stream, Florida.

Some of the golf courses designed by Alice Dye: 
 TPC at Sawgrass – Ponte Vedra Beach, Florida
 Crooked Stick Golf Club – Indianapolis, Indiana
 Whistling Straits – Kohler, Wisconsin
 PGA West – Palm Springs (La Quinta), California
 Kiawah Island Golf Resort (Ocean Course) – Kiawah Island, South Carolina

Tournament wins
1968 North and South Women's Amateur
1978 U.S. Senior Women's Amateur
1979 U.S. Senior Women's Amateur
1983 Canadian Women's Senior Championship
1984 Canadian Women's Senior Championship

Team appearances
Amateur
Curtis Cup (representing the United States): 1970 (winners)

References

External links
American Society of Golf Course Architects profile

American female golfers
Amateur golfers
Rollins Tars women's golfers
Golf course architects
Golfers from Indiana
American women sportswriters
American women non-fiction writers
Sportspeople from Indianapolis
People from Carmel, Indiana
1927 births
2019 deaths